Ray Stevens' Greatest Hits is a collection of songs that Ray Stevens previously recorded for Barnaby and Monument Records from 1968 to 1971. This marks the first album appearance of Stevens' novelty hit single "Bridget the Midget (The Queen of the Blues)." This collection contains two more singles from Barnaby while the rest are recordings for Monument (five singles and three album tracks). "Gitarzan" is the album version that begins with noises of an audience. "Harry the Hairy Ape" and "Ahab the Arab" are not the original recordings but re-recordings that were made for Monument. "Mr. Businessman" is the album version.

Track listing

Album credits
Produced and Arranged by: Ray Stevens for Ahab Productions
Cover photo: John Donegan

Charts
Album - Billboard (North America)

Singles - Billboard (North America)

1971 greatest hits albums
Barnaby Records compilation albums
Ray Stevens compilation albums